Don't Be Afraid is a 2011 Spanish drama film directed by Montxo Armendáriz.

Cast 
 Lluís Homar as Padre
 Belén Rueda as Madre 
 Núria Gago as Maite 
 Cristina Plazas as Psicóloga
 Rubén Ochandiano as Toni

See also 
 List of Spanish films of 2011

References

External links 

2011 drama films
2011 films
Spanish drama films
2010s Spanish films
2010s Spanish-language films